The New King of Comedy is a 2019 Chinese comedy-drama film directed, written, and produced by Stephen Chow. It is a remake of Chow's own 1999 film King of Comedy, this time set in Mainland China with different characters.

The film tells the story of a young woman who is dreaming and striving to pursue the actors' dream despite being an extra and stand-in. It was released in China on 5 February 2019 during the Lunar New Year 2019. With a budget of $8 million (US) along with few months of filming and post-production, it is believed to be the smallest project of Chow's career as a filmmaker.

Cast
 E Jingwen as Ru Meng
 Wang Baoqiang as Ma Ke
 Zhang Quandan as Charlie
 Jing Ruyang as Xiao Mi
 Zhang Qi as Ru Meng's father
 Yuan Xingzhe as Ru Meng's mother

Production
Stephen Chow began writing the film in 2015. Filming began in October 2018 and lasted only a few weeks.

For the movie, Chow cast people who could relate to the life of a struggling actor. He intentionally sought out Wang to play the male lead role, due to the latter's experience in working as an extra early in his career. Actress E Jingwen also worked as an extra prior to The New King of Comedy, similar to the character she played in the film.

Chow recruited the Chinese girl group Jí fēng shào nǚ, whose members were eliminated in the Chinese version of Produce 101, to sing the film's theme song.

Release
The New King of Comedy was released in China on 5 February 2019.

References

External links
 
 
 

2019 films
Chinese comedy films
Remakes of Chinese films
2019 comedy films
2010s Mandarin-language films